Xanthophyllum trichocladum is a plant in the family Polygalaceae. The specific epithet  is from the Greek meaning "hairy twig".

Description
The bark is whitish or yellowish grey. The flowers are pink, drying dark reddish.

Distribution and habitat
Xanthophyllum trichocladum is endemic to Borneo. Its habitat is mixed dipterocarp forest from sea-level to  altitude.

References

trichocladum
Endemic flora of Borneo
Plants described in 1929